Pitkin is a Statutory Town in Gunnison County, Colorado, United States. The population was 66 at the 2010 census, down from 124 at the 2000 Census.

Pitkin was founded in 1879, and is said to be Colorado's first mining camp west of the Continental Divide. Originally named Quartzville, it was renamed to honor Governor Frederick Walker Pitkin.

Geography
Pitkin is located at  (38.607886, -106.518454). Pitkin is at an elevation of 9,242 feet, about 28 miles northeast of Gunnison, Colorado.

Demographics

As of the census of 2000, there were 124 people, 47 households, and 35 families residing in the town. The racial makeup of the town was 87.90% White, 4.84% Asian, 1.61% from other races, and 5.65% from two or more races. Hispanic or Latino of any race were 20.16% of the population.

There were 47 households, out of which 23.4% had children under the age of 18 living with them, 61.7% were married couples living together, 10.6% had a female householder with no husband present, and 25.5% were non-families. 17.0% of all households were made up of individuals, and none had someone living alone who was 65 years of age or older. The average household size was 2.64 and the average family size was 2.94.

In the town, the population was spread out, with 22.6% under the age of 18, 4.8% from 18 to 24, 23.4% from 25 to 44, 33.9% from 45 to 64, and 15.3% who were 65 years of age or older. The median age was 45 years. For every 100 females, there were 85.1 males. For every 100 females age 18 and over, there were 100.0 males.

The median income for a household in the town was $49,375, and the median income for a family was $52,083. Males had a median income of $40,313 versus $34,375 for females. The per capita income for the town was $39,182. There were no families and 4.6% of the population living below the poverty line, including no under eighteens and 6.7% of those over 64.

See also

 List of municipalities in Colorado

References

External links

 
 CDOT map of the Town of Pitkin

Towns in Gunnison County, Colorado
Towns in Colorado
1879 establishments in Colorado